Asa Bird Gardiner (September 30, 1839 – May 24, 1919) was a controversial American soldier, attorney, and district attorney for New York County (a.k.a. the Borough of Manhattan) from 1898 to 1900.

He received the Medal of Honor for his service in the American Civil War in 1872 but it was  rescinded in 1917 when supporting documentation was not found. As a Judge Advocate in the United States Army, he prosecuted the case of Johnson Chesnut Whittaker, a black cadet at West Point.

He was elected New York County District Attorney in 1897, but was put on trial for corruption, and despite acquittal, was removed from office by Theodore Roosevelt in 1900. He refused to prosecute the corrupt Tammany Hall bosses of New York City, proclaiming "The hell with reform!" (or "Reform be damned!").

Early years
Asa Bird Gardiner was born on September 30, 1839, in New York City. His birth name was Asa Bird Gardner – without the "i" which he added when he legally changed his name in 1884. He was born at Fraunces Tavern, where his father and uncle were innkeepers.  His father later ran the Philadelphia Hotel.

He graduated A.B. from the College of the City of New York in 1859 and a LL.B. from New York University School of Law in 1860. He was admitted to the New York City Bar Association and began private practice as an attorney.

Civil War service
Shortly after the outbreak of the American Civil War, Gardiner was commissioned as a first lieutenant in the 31st New York Infantry Regiment on May 27, 1861, and was mustered out of service on August 7, 1861.  He was commissioned a captain in the 22nd National Guard Infantry (a.k.a. 22nd New York State Militia) on May 31, 1862, served in Baltimore, Maryland, and was honorably mustered out of service on September 5, 1862.

He was again commissioned a captain in the same regiment when it was reactivated on June 18, 1863, due to the movement of Lee's Army of Northern Virginia towards Pennsylvania.  Gardiner saw action at Sporting Hill, Pennsylvania, on June 30 and at Carlisle on July 1, where he was wounded in action.  Gardiner's wound was apparently minor, as there is no indication he suffered from a physical disability and he almost lived to the age of 80. Both actions were minor with the 22nd having no killed in action but it did have 9 and 12 soldiers wounded respectively on the 30th and the 1st.

Gardiner was mustered out of active service on July 24, 1863.   On May 16, 1865, Gardiner was commissioned a first lieutenant in the Veteran Reserve Corps to rank from February 11, 1865, and served as adjutant of the 7th Veteran Reserve Corps Regiment until he was honorably mustered out of service on August 13, 1866.  Gardiner was brevetted to the rank of captain on March 13, 1865, for "gallant and meritorious service during the war".

Medal of Honor
For his actions at the Battle of Sporting Hill Gardiner received the Medal of Honor on September 23, 1872, for "distinguished service performed during the war while serving as Captain 22nd New York State Militia".  Gardiner's award of the Medal of Honor was rescinded in early 1917 after a review panel, led by retired Lieutenant General Nelson A. Miles, found there was no evidence to support Gardiner deserving the award.  Although Gardiner's award was rescinded, he refused to return the medal.

Post-Civil War military service

After the end of the Civil War, Gardiner was commissioned a second lieutenant of the 9th Infantry Regiment of the Regular Army, to rank from July 20, 1866, and was promoted to first lieutenant on February 14, 1868. He transferred to the 1st Artillery Regiment on April 3, 1869, and served for a time as aide-de-camp to Major General Irvin McDowell who was commander of the Department of the East with its headquarters on Governors Island in New York Harbor.

On September 23, 1872, Gardiner received the Medal of Honor for his services in action at Sporting Hill, Pennsylvania, on June 30, 1863, and the defense of Carlisle, Pennsylvania, on July 1 and 2 of the same year.

In February 1917, the Army revoked Gardiner's Medal of Honor on the grounds that there was no record in the archives of its having been issued. Gardiner refused to return his medal and the matter was controversial until Gardiner died in 1919.

Gardiner served as an aide de camp, presumably to Secretary of War William W. Belknap, from October 4, 1872, to August 19, 1873.

Gardiner was promoted to the rank of major on August 18, 1873, and served as a Judge Advocate for 15 years until he retired from the Army on December 8, 1888.

By an act of Congress, the United States Military Academy at West Point established a Department of Law in 1874, with a senior Judge Advocate as its first professor of law.  Secretary of War William W. Belknap appointed Gardiner to the post, and he became the first lawyer to teach law at the Academy. Gardiner initiated the entire law curriculum, including study of the Lieber Code and a textbook he himself wrote.

Gardiner served at West Point as Professor of Law from July 20, 1874, to August 28, 1878.  Although his obituary in The New York Times stated that he held the rank of lieutenant colonel during this time, and that Gardiner was usually referred to as "Colonel Gardiner", the official Army Registers from this time period list Gardiner as a major.  Ironically, Gardiner's government issue headstone gives his rank as captain.

Notable courts martial

While serving as a judge advocate, Gardiner was involved in several high-profile legal proceedings.

In 1875, while still at West Point, Gardiner was chosen by President Ulysses S. Grant to be the presiding judge advocate general at the Whiskey Ring court-martial of Brevet Brigadier General Orville E. Babcock, Grant's personal secretary. The civilian grand jury that had already convened refused to turn over its evidence, however, and the court-martial adjourned; Babcock was later acquitted.

In 1878, a commission reviewed the court-martial of Major General Fitz John Porter, who had been dismissed from the Army in 1863 for his actions at the battle of Second Bull Run. The commission chairman, General John M. Schofield, appointed Gardiner as recorder, but he "took upon himself the role of a judge advocate in a court-martial," contesting evidence favorable to Porter. The commission ultimately re-instated Porter.  Gardiner’s unethical conduct on the board angered Schofield to the point that Schofield lodged an official complaint with the War Department and prepared court-martial charges against him.

In 1880, one of the first black cadets at West Point, Johnson Chesnut Whittaker, was assaulted by three fellow cadets, but administrators at the Academy said he had faked the attack. After a year of inquests and hearings including the attention of the United States Congress, Whittaker was court-martialed, with Gardiner as prosecutor, resulting in Whittaker's expulsion. The verdict was overturned in 1883 by President Arthur on the ground of faulty evidence, but the expulsion was immediately reinstated by the Secretary of War on the grounds that Whittaker had failed an exam. In 1995, acting on a request from Congress, President Clinton awarded Whittaker a posthumous commission as second lieutenant.

In 1884, Gardiner was selected for another high-profile prosecution, that of his superior, Brigadier General David G. Swaim, the Judge Advocate General of the Army. Swaim was convicted of financial improprieties and suspended from duty.

Later military career
On July 11, 1884, Gardiner legally changed the spelling of his last name from "Gardner" to "Gardiner".  This was, according to a letter he wrote The New York Times, to conform to the spelling of the last name by his ancestors who lived in Rhode Island.

In 1887 Gardiner was appointed Acting Assistant Secretary of War and held the position until he retired from the Army on December 8, 1888, for "disability in the line of duty".  On April 23, 1904, Gardner was promoted, along with numerous other retired officers, to the rank of lieutenant colonel on the Army Retired List in recognition of his service in the Union Army during the Civil War.

New York politics
After his retirement from the Army, Gardiner pursued the private practice of law in New York City. He became active in the Tammany Hall political machine, the major faction of the New York City Democrats. A history of the society calls him a "simon-pure Democrat" who followed his father and grandfather's participation in the Tammany Society, where in 1901 he was elected a sachem.

Gardiner was allied with Tammany Hall boss Richard Croker and, in November 1897, was elected on the Democratic ticket as New York County District Attorney.  During the campaign Gardiner said, "Reform be damned!" when confronted with calls to confront the corruption of Tammany Hall.

He took office on January 1, 1898, together with the first elected officers of the newly consolidated City of New York (which added the boroughs of Brooklyn, Queens and Staten Island to Manhattan and the Bronx).

In December 1900 formal charges were brought against Gardiner for "interfering with deputies of the Attorney General in presentation of election cases to the Grand Jury and the prosecution thereof".  Governor Theodore Roosevelt removed Gardiner from office later that month after Garidner chose not to contest the charges.

Among the beneficiaries of Gardiner's anti-reform attitude was saloonkeeper Frank J. Farrell, who is said to have opened three hundred pool halls (in reality fronts for bookmakers) after his friend took office, building a fortune that he would use to bring the New York Yankees to town in 1903.

In 1908 Gardiner was hired by the State of New York to represent the state in opposing the extradition of Harry K. Thaw to Pittsburgh, Pennsylvania, to testify in a bankruptcy case.  Thaw had been judged insane in his trial for murdering architect Stanford White in 1906.  Gardiner argued that, as Thaw had been adjudicated as insane, Thaw could not be called to testify in court.  The state offered a fee to Gardiner of $2,000 but Gardiner presented the state with a bill for $15,000.  Gardiner's rationalization of the high fee was that he had spent five months on the case while Thaw's mother spent $100,000 in legal fees.

On September 10, 1913, he was the orator at the centennial commemoration of the Battle of Lake Erie in Newport, Rhode Island.  He wore the uniform of the Veteran Corps of Artillery and spoke in his capacity as the Commandant of the Military Society of the War of 1812.  A contemporary newspaper article described Gardiner as "one of the ablest orators Newport has ever heard".

Military and hereditary societies
Gardiner was active in several military and hereditary societies including the Society of the Cincinnati (Secretary General and President of the Rhode Island Society), the Military Order of the Loyal Legion of the United States (elected November 6, 1867, insignia number 586), the Grand Army of the Republic (member of James Monroe Post), the Sons of the Revolution (founding member in 1883, insignia number 83), the  Military Society of the War of 1812 (vice president in 1890 and president in 1908), the Veteran Corps of Artillery of the State of New York (vice commandant with rank of lieutenant colonel in 1890 and commandant with rank of colonel in 1908) and the General Society of the War of 1812 (elected to membership in 1892).

Gardiner was commissioned a lieutenant colonel in the New York State Militia when he was elected vice commandant of the Veteran Corps of Artillery in 1890 and was promoted to colonel when he was elected commandant in 1908. This is why Gardiner was frequently referred to as "Colonel Gardiner".

Gardiner was also a member of the Union Club, the Metropolitan Club and the Delta Kappa Epsilon fraternity.

Society of the Cincinnati
In 1877 Gardiner joined the Society of the Cincinnati, a military society founded by officers who had served in the American Revolution and perpetuated by their descendants.  Gardiner was a key figure the re-establishment of the Rhode Island Society of the Cincinnati – which had been dormant since 1835.  In 1878, Gardiner was elected as the Rhode Island Society's Assistant Secretary.

Gardiner joined the Society by right of his descent from his great uncle, Lieutenant Jonathan Willard (1744–1832).  Although Lieutenant Willard was a veteran of the 1st New Hampshire Regiment, and the Society has a tradition of members joining the state Society which their ancestor was eligible to join, the Rhode Island Society had an exception in its membership requirements to admit members who were descendants of officers whose state did not have an active society. As New Hampshire did not have an active society in 1877, Gardiner was permitted to join the Rhode Island Society.

Gardiner was elected Secretary General of the National Society in 1884 and, in the same year, authored Precedents and Ordinances of the General Society of the Cincinnati.  Through his efforts to recruit new members, define policies and establish administrative procedures, he was probably the single person most responsible for the rejuvenation for the Society of the Cincinnati in the late 19th century.

Gardiner was elected president of the Rhode Island Society following at a special meeting of the Rhode Island Society on December 14, 1899, which was called as a result of the death of President Nathanael Greene, M.D. (b. 1809) (the grandson of General Nathanael Greene) on July 8, 1899.  Gardiner remained president of the Rhode Island Society, as well as Secretary General of the national Society, until his death in 1919.

In the 41 years that Gardiner was active in the Society, it grew greatly both in membership and prestige and all of the dormant state societies were rejuvenated.

In March 1901 Gardiner traveled, on behalf of the Rhode Island Society, to Savannah, Georgia, and located the grave of Major General Nathanael Greene, a native of Rhode Island and hero of the American Revolution.  Gardiner was able to locate General Greene's grave and although some thought was given to moving Greene's remains to Rhode Island, but it did not come to fruition.

Gardiner was highly involved in the planning for the dedication of a statue of the French nobleman Rochambeau in Lafayette Square in Washington, D.C., on May 24, 1902.  The ceremony involved an official delegation from France, senior officers the United States Army and Navy, as well as the Society of the Cincinnati.  President Theodore Roosevelt gave the keynote address at the ceremony.

In 1905 the Rhode Island Society published The Order of the Cincinnati in France, which Gardiner wrote.  The 243 page volume contains detailed biographies of all the senior officers of the French Army who served in America during the revolution.

Gardiner was succeeded in the Society by his son Asa Bird Gardiner, Jr. (1872–1936).  His nephew, Norman Bentley Gardiner, II, became a member of the Rhode Island Society in 1945 and was a member until his death in 1982.

Family

Gardiner married Mary Austen of Baltimore, Maryland, on October 18, 1865.  They had three sons: Asa Bird Jr., Philip and Norman. Mary Austen Gardiner died in June 1900. Gardiner's son Philip served as a major in the Army Judge Advocate General Corps during the First World War. Asa Bird Gardiner Jr. was a prominent milk distributor in Baltimore and succeeded his father in the Society of the Cincinnati.

On November 5, 1902, at the age of 63, Gardiner married Harriet Isabelle Lindsay, by whom he had two sons, John and William.

Death
Asa Bird Gardiner died of a stroke of apoplexy at his home, Orrell Manor, in Suffern, New York, on May 24, 1919, at the age of 79.  He was buried in Green-Wood Cemetery in Brooklyn. His headstone shows his rank as "CAPT", despite the fact he was promoted to the rank of lieutenant colonel after his retirement from the Army.

In popular culture
Gardiner was portrayed by actor John Glover in the 1994 television movie Assault at West Point: The Court-Martial of Johnson Whittaker which portrays the experiences of African-American Cadet Johnson Chesnut Whittaker.

Gardiner was also featured in Douglas Jone's alternate history novel The Court Martial Of George Armstrong Custer as the military prosecutor who tries General Custer for negligence after he survives the Battle of Little Big Horn.

See also

 List of Medal of Honor recipients

References

Further reading
 Roger D. Cunningham. Always a Storm Centre: The Trials and Tribulations of Lt. Col. Asa Bird Gardiner. Journal of America's Past. Fall 2006.

External links
 

1839 births
1919 deaths
American legal writers
American military writers
New York County District Attorneys
Purged Medal of Honor recipients
City College of New York alumni
New York University School of Law alumni
Burials at Green-Wood Cemetery
Union Army officers
United States Army officers
United States Military Academy faculty
People acquitted of corruption
People from Suffern, New York
New York (state) Democrats
19th-century American politicians